The women's 75 kg boxing event at the 2015 European Games in Baku was held from 19 to 25 June 2015 at the Baku Crystal Hall.

Results

References

Women 75
2015 in women's boxing